A total solar eclipse occurred on June 20, 1955. A solar eclipse occurs when the Moon passes between Earth and the Sun, thereby totally or partly obscuring the image of the Sun for a viewer on Earth. A total solar eclipse occurs when the Moon's apparent diameter is larger than the Sun's, blocking all direct sunlight, turning day into darkness. Totality occurs in a narrow path across Earth's surface, with the partial solar eclipse visible over a surrounding region thousands of kilometres wide.
With a maximum duration of 7 minutes 7.74 seconds, this is the longest solar eclipse of saros series 136, as well as the longest total solar eclipse since the 11th century, and until the 22nd century, because greatest eclipse occurred near the Equator. Totality beginning over the Indian Ocean, British Seychelles (today's Seychelles) and Maldives, crossing Ceylon (name changed to Sri Lanka later) including the capital city Colombo, Andaman Islands, Burma, Thailand including the capital city Bangkok, Cambodia, Laos, South Vietnam (now belonging to Vietnam), Paracel Islands and Scarborough Shoal (near the greatest eclipse), moving across the Philippines including the capital city Manila, Kayangel Atoll in the Trust Territory of the Pacific Islands (now belonging to Palau), Nukumanu Islands in the Territory of Papua New Guinea (today's Papua New Guinea), towards northern Ontong Java Atoll in British Solomon Islands (today's Solomon Islands) ending over Southwestern Pacific Ocean. It was the second central solar eclipse visible from Bangkok from 1948 to 1958, where it is rare for a large city to witness 4 central solar eclipses in just 9.945 years.

Related eclipses

Solar eclipses of 1953–1956

Saros 136

Inex series

Metonic series

Notes

References

 Photometry of the Solar Corona at the Eclipse on June 20, 1955,  Publications of the Astronomical Society of Japan, vol. 8, p.126 (1956).
 Nasa.gov

1955 06 20
1955 in science
1955 06 20
June 1955 events